Chicoreus torrefactus, common name the firebrand murex,  is a species of sea snail, a marine gastropod mollusk in the family Muricidae, the murex snails or rock snails.

Description
The size of an adult shell varies between 60 mm and 160 mm. This common species of sea snail is often used for food and shellcraft. In some localities, populations have been greatly reduced because of over collecting.  The specie can also be found in shallow subtidal waters.

Distribution
This species occurs in the Indian Ocean off Chagos, Madagascar, the Mascarene Basin, Tanzania and Durban, South Africa.

References

 Sowerby, G. B. II, 1841. - Description of some new species of Murex, principally from the collection of H. Cuming, Esq.. Proceedings of the Zoological Society of London 8("1840"): 137-147
 Dautzenberg, Ph. (1929). Mollusques testacés marins de Madagascar. Faune des Colonies Francaises, Tome III
 Houart, R. & Pain, T., 1982. On the designation of neotype for Chicoreus (Chicoreus) torrefactus (Sow., 1841) and description of a new species: Chicoreus (Chicoreus) kilburni sp. nov. (Gastropoda : Muricidae : Muricinae). Informations de la Société Belge de Malacologie 1(4): 51-56, sér. série 10
 Drivas, J. & M. Jay (1988). Coquillages de La Réunion et de l'île Maurice
 Kei LWK. & Lau SCK. (1994). Baseline information survey of shelter island - a potential marine park. Final report. Submitted to the Agriculture and Fisheries Department, The Hong Kong SAR Government.
 Liu, J.Y. [Ruiyu] (ed.). (2008). Checklist of marine biota of China seas. China Science Press. 1267 pp
 Houart R., Kilburn R.N. & Marais A.P. (2010) Muricidae. Pp. 176-270, in: Marais A.P. & Seccombe A.D. (eds), Identification guide to the seashells of South Africa. Volume 1. Groenkloof: Centre for Molluscan Studies. 376 pp.

External links
 
 Sowerby, G. B., I; Sowerby, G. B., II. (1832-1841). The conchological illustrations or, Coloured figures of all the hitherto unfigured recent shells. London, privately published
 MNHN, Paris: neotype

Chicoreus
Gastropods described in 1841